is a shōjo manga magazine published by Shinshokan. Published bi-monthly, it features articles on action and fiction aimed at women in the age group of 16–20 years. Headquartered in Tokyo, the magazine previously had the following editions namely Shinshokan South (aka South), Phantom Club, Huckleberry, Un Poco and Wings: Story; however, currently, only Un Poco and Wings:Story are still being published.

Serializations

Current
Hyakushō Kizoku by Hiromu Arakawa (2006–present)
Kase-san and Yamada by Hiromi Takashima (2017–present)

Former
1980s
Dragon Fist by Shu Katayama (1988–2005)
Earthian by Yun Kōga (1988–1994)
RG Veda by Clamp (1989–1996)

1990s
Dragon Knights by Mineko Ohkami (1990–2007)
Tokyo Babylon by Clamp (1990–1993)
Sanban-chō Hagiwara-ya no Bijin by Keiko Nishi (1991-2000)
Hidarite by Clamp (1994)
The Young Magician by Yuri Narushima (1995–2016)
Vampire Game by Judal (1996–2004)
Liling-Po by Ako Yutenji (1997-2006)
The Day of Revolution by Mikiyo Tsuda (1998–2001)
The Demon Ororon by Hakase Mizuki (1998–2001)
Antique Bakery by Fumi Yoshinaga (1999–2002)
Eerie Queerie! by Shuri Shiozu (1999–2003)
Garden Dreams by Fumi Yoshinaga (1999)
Immortal Rain by Kaori Ozaki (1999–2011)
Weiß Kreuz Verbrechen & Strafe by Takehito Koyasu and Kyoko Tsuchiya (1997–1998)

2000s
Cafe Kichijoji de by Yuki Miyamoto and Kyoko Negishi (2000–2002)
Stigma by Kazuya Minekura (2000)
La Esperança by Chigusa Kawai (2000–2006)
Black Sun, Silver Moon by Tomo Maeda (2001–2006)
The Devil Within by Ryō Takagi (2002–2004)
Princess Princess by Mikiyo Tsuda (2002–2006)
Train Train by Eiki Eiki (2002–2005)
Baku by Hakase Mizuki (2003)
Demon Flowers by Hakase Mizuki (2004–2006)
Flower of Life by Fumi Yoshinaga (2004–2007)
Princess Ai by Courtney Love, D.J. Milky, Ai Yazawa, and Misaho Kujiradou (2004–2005)
Princess Princess + by Mikiyo Tsuda (2006–2007)
Alice the 101st by Chigusa Kawai (2007–2015)
Empire of Midnight by Hakase Mizuki (2007)
Happy Boys by Makoto Tateno (2007–2008)

See also
Dear+, boys' love (BL) companion magazine to Wings

References

External links
Shinshokan's Wings page 

1982 establishments in Japan
Bi-monthly manga magazines published in Japan
Magazines established in 1982
Magazines published in Tokyo
Shinshokan
Shōjo manga magazines